Tumor progression is the third and last phase in tumor development. This phase is characterised by increased growth speed and invasiveness of the tumor cells. As a result of the progression, phenotypical changes occur and the tumor becomes more aggressive and acquires greater malignant potential. Together with the progression, more and more aneuploidy occurs. This may be evident as nuclear polymorphism.

See also
 Tumor initiation
 Tumor promotion

References

External links 
 Progression entry in the public domain NCI Dictionary of Cancer Terms

Carcinogenesis